The Veil of Veronica, or  (Latin for sweat-cloth), also known as the Vernicle and often called simply the Veronica, is a Christian relic consisting of a piece of cloth said to bear an image of the Holy Face of Jesus produced by other than human means (an acheiropoieton, "made without hand"). Various existing images have been claimed to be the original relic, as well as early copies of it; representations of it are also known as vernicles.

The story of the image's origin is related to the sixth Station of the Cross, wherein Saint Veronica, encountering Jesus along the Via Dolorosa to Calvary, wipes the blood and sweat from his face with her veil. According to some versions, St. Veronica later traveled to Rome to present the cloth to the Roman Emperor Tiberius. The veil has been said to quench thirst, cure blindness, and even raise the dead.

The first written evidence of the story is from the Middle Ages, and during the 14th century, the veil became a central icon in the Western Church. In the words of art historian Neil Macgregor, "From [the 14th Century] on, wherever the Roman Church went, the Veronica would go with it." The act of Saint Veronica wiping the face of Jesus with her veil is celebrated in the sixth Station of the Cross in many Anglican, Catholic, and Western Orthodox churches.

Evolution of the story

There is no reference to the story of Veronica and her veil in the canonical Gospels. The closest written reference is the miracle of Jesus healing the bleeding woman by touching the hem of Jesus' garment; her name is later identified as Veronica by the apocryphal "Acts of Pilate". The story was later elaborated in the 11th century by adding that Christ gave her a portrait of himself on a cloth, with which she later cured Tiberius. The linking of this with the bearing of the cross in the Passion, and the miraculous appearance of the image, was made by Roger d'Argenteuil's Bible in French in the 13th century, and gained further popularity following the internationally popular work Meditations on the Life of Christ of about 1300. It is also at this point that other depictions of the image change to include a crown of thorns, blood, and the expression of a man in pain, and the image became very common throughout Catholic Europe, forming part of the Arma Christi, and with the meeting of Jesus and Veronica becoming one of the Stations of the Cross.

Origin of the name
According to the Catholic Encyclopedia, the name "Veronica" is a colloquial portmanteau of the Latin word , meaning "truth", and Greek , meaning "image"; the Veil of Veronica was therefore largely regarded in medieval times as "the true image", and the truthful representation of Jesus, preceding the Shroud of Turin.

History of the veil 

That there was a physical image venerated as the Veil of Veronica and displayed in Rome from the 14th century on is clear, but the provenance of this image is uncertain.

It has often been assumed that the Veil of Veronica was present in the Old St Peter's in the papacy of Pope John VII (705-8), as a chapel known as the Veronica chapel was built during his reign. It would appear, however, that the Veil of Veronica was in place by 1011 when a scribe was identified as keeper of the cloth.

Firm records of the Veil begin only in 1199, when two pilgrims, Gerald de Barri (Giraldus Cambrensis) and Gervase of Tilbury, made two accounts at different times of a visit to Rome, making direct reference to the existence of the Veil of Veronica. Shortly after that, in 1207, the cloth became more prominent when it was publicly paraded and displayed by Pope Innocent III, who also granted indulgences to anyone praying before it. This procession, between St Peter's and the Santo Spirito Hospital, became an annual event and on one such occasion in 1300 Pope Boniface VIII, who had it translated to St. Peter's in 1297, was inspired to proclaim the first Jubilee in 1300. For the next two hundred years, the Veil, retained at Old St Peter's, was regarded as the most precious of all Christian relics; there Pedro Tafur, a Spanish visitor in 1436, noted:
On the right hand is a pillar as high as a small tower, and in it is the holy Veronica. When it is to be exhibited an opening is made in the roof of the church and a wooden chest or cradle is let down, in which are two clerics, and when they have descended, the chest or cradle is drawn up, and they, with the greatest reverence, take out the Veronica and show it to the people, who make concourse there upon the appointed day. It happens often that the worshippers are in danger of their lives, so many are they and so great is the press.Pedro Tafur, Andanças e viajes.

After the Sack of Rome in 1527, some writers recorded that the Veil had been destroyed: Messer Unbano tells the Duchess of Urbino that the Veronica was stolen and passed around the taverns of Rome. Other writers however, testify to its continuing presence in the Vatican and one witness to the sacking states that the Veronica was not found by the looters.

Many artists of the time created reproductions of the Veronica, again suggesting its survival, but in 1616, Pope Paul V prohibited the manufacture of further copies unless made by a canon of Saint Peter's Basilica. In 1629, Pope Urban VIII not only prohibited reproductions of the Veronica from being made, but also ordered the destruction of all existing copies. His edict declared that anyone who had access to a copy must bring it to the Vatican, under penalty of excommunication. In the 17th century the veil was found hidden in a relic chamber built by Bernini into one of the piers supporting the dome of St Peter's.

As there is no conclusive evidence that it ever left St Peter's, the possibility exists that it remains there to this day; this would be consistent with such limited information as the Vatican has provided in recent centuries.

Images traditionally connected with the Veil of Veronica 
There are at least six images in existence which bear a marked resemblance to each other and which are claimed to be the original Veil, a direct copy of it or, in two cases, the Mandylion. Each member of this group is enclosed in an elaborate outer frame with a gilded metal sheet (or riza in Russian) within, in which is cut an aperture where the face appears; at the lower extreme of the face there are three points which correspond to the shape of the hair and beard.

St. Peter's Basilica 
There is an image kept in St. Peter's Basilica purported to be Veronica's veil. This image is stored in the chapel that lies behind the balcony in the southwest pier supporting the dome.

In the 19th century, Xavier Barbier de Montault privately viewed the veil. His account is presented by Adolphe Napoléon Didron in Volume 23 of Annales Archéologiques. He confers, "Unfortunately, by one of these too frequent customs in Italy, a metal blade covers the interior and leaves only the figure, from which it draws the contours. To these contours, frankly accused, we suspect long hair that falls on the shoulders, and a short beard that turns into two little-supplied wicks. The rest of the features are so vaguely drawn, or rather so completely erased, that I needed the best will in the world to see the trace of the eyes or the nose."

In 1907, Jesuit art historian Joseph Wilpert was allowed to remove two plates of crystal to inspect the image. He describes only a square fabric of penny hue, yellowed with age, with two large, faint rust-brown stains. He then says the object corresponds to the oldest documents, and cites two of them. 

Nevertheless, the face is still displayed each year on the occasion of the 5th Sunday of Lent, Passion Sunday, in a tradition that dates back to the seventeenth century. Just before vespers, there is a procession within the basilica, accompanied to the Litany of the Saints. A bell rings and three canons carry the heavy frame out on the balcony above the statue of St. Veronica holding the veil. From this limited view no image is discernible and it is only possible to see the shape of the inner frame.

The Hofburg Palace, Vienna
In the Hofburg Palace in Vienna there is a copy of the Veronica, identified by the signature of P. Strozzi in the right hand corner of the inner frame. He was the secretary of Pope Paul V, and a man referred to by Vatican notary Jacopo Grimaldi as making a series of six meticulous copies of the veil in 1617.

The outside of the frame is relatively modern, while the inner frame is roughly made and corresponds to the cut-out pattern of earlier copies. The face within is very unclear, more a series of blotches in which only the bare elements of a nose, eyes and mouth can be identified. This argues for the authenticity of the copy as there is clearly no attempt at artistic enhancement. Furthermore, the fact of its being copied from the Vatican copy after the Sack of Rome in 1527 suggests that the original image may have survived that event.

It is kept in the Schatzkammer of Sacred and Secular Treasurers of the Habsburg dynasty in the Hofburg Palace, Vienna.

Monastery of the Holy Face, Alicante, Spain 
The Holy Face of Alicante was acquired by Pope Nicholas V from relatives of the Byzantine Emperor in 1453. This veil was given by a Vatican cardinal to a Spanish priest, Mosen Pedro Mena, who took it to Alicante, in southern Spain, where it arrived in 1489, at the same time as a severe drought. Carried in a procession on 17 March by an Alicante priest, Father Villafranca, a tear sprang from the eye of the face of Christ on the veil and rain began to fall. The relic is now housed in the Monastery of the Holy Face, on the outskirts of Alicante, in a chapel built in 1611 and decorated between 1677 and 1680 by the sculptor José Vilanova, the gilder Pere Joan Valero and the painter Juan Conchillos. The chapel is decorated with paintings depicting the miraculous termination of the drought, local personalities associated with the founding of the chapel and religious themes of judgment and salvation.

The monastery was extensively restored between 2003 and 2006, together with the Cathedral of Saint Nicholas and the Basilica of St Mary in the city centre. The three buildings housed an exhibition in 2006 about the relic, titled 'The Face of Eternity'.

Jaén Cathedral, Jaén, Spain 
The cathedral of Jaén has a copy of the Veronica which probably dates from the 14th century, and originated in Siena. It is kept in a shrine by the high altar and is annually exhibited to the people on Good Friday and on the Feast of the Assumption. It is exhibited in a chapel to the side of the Cathedral every Friday from 11.30 a.m. to 1 p.m., when visitors are allowed to kiss the glass that protects the image. Known as the Santo Rostro, it was acquired by Bishop Nicholas de Biedma in the 14th century.

Similar images

Holy Face of Genoa 

Kept in the modest Church of St Bartholomew of The Armenians, Genoa, the Holy Face of Genoa was given in the 14th century to the Doge Leonardo Montaldo by the Byzantine Emperor John V Palaeologus.

The image was studied in detail in 1969 by Colette Dufour Bozzo, who dated the outer frame to the late 14th century, while the inner frame and the image itself are believed to have originated earlier. Bozzo found that the image was imprinted on a cloth that had been pasted onto a wooden board. The similarity of the image with the Veil of Veronica suggests a link between the two traditions.

Holy Face of San Silvestro 
The Holy Face of San Silvestro was kept in Rome's church of San Silvestro until 1870, and is now kept in the Matilda chapel in the Vatican. It is housed in a Baroque frame donated by one Sister Dionora Chiarucci in 1623. The earliest evidence of its existence is 1517, when the nuns were forbidden to exhibit it to avoid competition with the Veronica. Like the Genoa image, it is painted on board, and therefore is likely to be a copy.

It was exhibited at Germany's Expo 2000 in the pavilion of the Holy See.

The Manoppello Image 

In 1999, German Jesuit Father Heinnrich Pfeiffer, Professor of Art History at the Pontifical Gregorian University, announced at a press conference in Rome that he had found the Veil in a church of a Capuchin monastery, in the small village of Manoppello, Italy, where it had been since 1660. Professor Pfeiffer had, in fact, been promoting this image for many years before. It is known as the Manoppello Image.

According to local tradition, an anonymous pilgrim arrived in 1508 with the cloth inside a wrapped package. The pilgrim gave it to Dr. Giacomo Antonio Leonelli, who was sitting on a bench in front of the church. The doctor went into the church and opened the parcel containing the Veil. At once, he went out of the church, but could not find the pilgrim who had donated it.

The Veil was owned by the Leonelli family until 1608. Pancrazio Petrucci, a soldier married to Marzia Leonelli, stole the Veil from his father-in-law's house. A few years later, Marzia sold it for 400 scudi to Doctor Donato Antonio De Fabritiis to pay a ransom demand for her husband, who was then a prisoner in Chieti. The Veil was given by De Fabritiis to the Capuchins, who still hold it today. This history was documented by Father Donato da Bomba in his Relatione historica following research started in 1640.

House of Veronica in Jerusalem

On the Via Dolorosa in Jerusalem there is a small chapel, known as the Chapel of the Holy Face. Traditionally, this is regarded as the home of St Veronica and site of the miracle.

Representative art 

There are two main traditions for the iconography of the face depicted on the veil. One tradition (Type I), common in Italian art, shows the face of Christ as full-bearded, in pain, scourged and perhaps crowned with thorns. Another (Type II), common in Russian and Spanish art, shows Christ's face more often in repose, hair extending to shoulder length and a bifurcated beard, often surrounded by a halo quartered in a cross.

Type I
 Veronica's Veil Domenico Fetti, .
 Holy Face Giambono, 15th century. Civic Museum, Pavia, Italy.
 Holy Face Held by Two Angels Juan Sánchez Cotan, 1620–1625. Monastery of Cartuja, Granada.
 Holy Face Domenikos Theotokopoulos (El Greco). Convent of Capuchin Nuns, Toledo.
 Veronica's Veil Francisco de Zurbarán, 17th century. Parish Church of St Peter, Seville.

Type II
 Head of Christ on the Sudarium Claude Mellan, 1649.
 Diptych of Saint Veronica with Christ and the Virgin Mary Bernardo Martorelli, 15th century. Museum of Mallorca.
 Holy Face, anonymous, early 17th century. Tretyakov Gallery, Moscow.
 Holy Face Simon Ushakov, 1678. Tretyakov Gallery, Moscow.
 Miracle of the Tear Juan Conchillos, 1680. Lady Chapel of the Monastery of the Holy Face, Alicante.
 Miracle of the Three faces Juan de Miranda, 1767. Alicante Ayuntamiento.
 Saint Veronica Antonio Castillo Lastrucci, 1946. Basilica of St Mary, Alicante.

See also 
 Acheiropoieta
 Black Madonna of Częstochowa
 Image of Camuliana
 Image of Edessa
 Relics associated with Jesus
 Shroud of Turin
 Sudarium of Oviedo

References

Further reading 
 
 Joan Carroll Cruz, OCDS, Miraculous Images of Our Lord. 
 Ewa Kuryluk, Veronica and Her Cloth: History, Symbolism, and Structure of a True Image. 
 Ian Wilson, Holy Faces, Secret Places, Corgi,

External links 

 The New Schaff-Herzog Encyclopedia of Religious Knowledge
 official website of Capuchin Friars of Manoppello
 St. Veronica in St. Peter's
 "Clip of the Catholic News Service featuring the relic in St. Peter's Basilica"
 "Polish website Volto Santo di Manoppello"
 "English version of Polish website Volto Santo di Manoppello"
 Sudarium Christi The Face of Christ online audio visual featuring texts by sudarium expert Sr. Blandina Paschalis Schlömer et al.
 The Rediscovered Face – 1 first of four installments of an audiovisual presentation relating the holy image with a number of ancient predecessors, YouTube, access date March 2013.
 Exposition of the relic, St. Peter's Basilica, 2008

Relics associated with Jesus
Christian iconography
Christian terminology